Gustavo Blanco Petersen Macedo, known simply as Gustavo Blanco (born 3 October 1994), is a Brazilian professional footballer who plays as a central midfielder.

Career
Born in Salvador, Bahia, Blanco joined Esporte Clube Bahia aged 16 and was promoted to the senior team in early 2015. He made 13 appearances in the Série B during his first professional season.

On 23 December 2016, Blanco was loaned to América Mineiro on a season-long deal. However, his performances in the 2017 Campeonato Mineiro campaign caught the eye of rivals Atlético Mineiro, who signed him on 3 July 2017 on a loan deal that included a buyout clause. He spent his first season at Atlético as a substitute, totaling eight appearances in all competitions.

Blanco made his first team breakthrough at the start of the 2018 Série A season, drawing praise from fans and critics for his passing and defensive qualities, as well as for his high work rate on the pitch. On 21 May 2018, Atlético acquired him permanently on a four-year deal. On 2 July 2018, he suffered an ACL injury in his left knee which sidelined him for 22 months. He returned to training in May 2020, and in October joined Goiás on loan for the remainder of the 2020 Série A season. He made his first appearance in over two years on 14 November, in a 1–0 league defeat to Athletico Paranaense.

On 15 March 2021, Blanco joined Fortaleza on loan for the remainder of the season.

Career statistics

Honours
Bahia
Campeonato Baiano: 2015

América Mineiro
Campeonato Brasileiro Série B: 2017

Atlético Mineiro
Campeonato Mineiro: 2020

Fortaleza
Campeonato Cearense: 2021

References

External links

1994 births
Living people
Sportspeople from Salvador, Bahia
Brazilian footballers
Association football midfielders
Campeonato Brasileiro Série A players
Campeonato Brasileiro Série B players
Esporte Clube Bahia players
América Futebol Clube (MG) players
Clube Atlético Mineiro players
Goiás Esporte Clube players
Fortaleza Esporte Clube players
Londrina Esporte Clube players
Esporte Clube Vitória players